Adelaide River is a river in the Northern Territory of Australia.

Adelaide River may also refer to:
 Adelaide River, Northern Territory, a town in the Northern Territory of Australia
 Adelaide River (Brazil), a river in Paraná state in southern Brazil
 Adelaide River railway station, a former railway station in the Northern Territory of Australia
 Adelaide River virus, a negative-sense single-stranded RNA virus of the family Rhabdoviridae

See also 
 Adelaide (disambiguation)